Riverfront Stadium, also known as Cinergy Field from 1996 to 2002, was a multi-purpose stadium in Cincinnati, Ohio, United States that was the home of the Cincinnati Reds of Major League Baseball from 1970 through 2002 and the Cincinnati Bengals of the National Football League from 1970 to 1999. Located on the Ohio River in downtown Cincinnati, the stadium was best known as the home of "The Big Red Machine", as the Reds were often called in the 1970s.

Construction began on February 1, 1968, and was completed at a cost of less than $50 million. Riverfront's grand opening was held on June 30, 1970, an 8–2 Reds loss to the Atlanta Braves. Braves right fielder Hank Aaron hit the first home run in Riverfront's history, a two-run shot in the first inning which also served as the stadium's first runs batted in. Two weeks later on July 14, 1970, Riverfront hosted the 1970 Major League Baseball All-Star Game. This game is best remembered for the often-replayed collision at home plate between Reds star Pete Rose and catcher Ray Fosse of the Cleveland Indians.

In September 1996, Riverfront Stadium was renamed "Cinergy Field" in a sponsorship deal with Greater Cincinnati energy company Cinergy. In 2001, to make room for Great American Ball Park, the seating capacity at Cinergy Field was reduced to 39,000. There was a huge in-play wall in center field visible after the renovations, to serve as the batter's eye. The stadium was demolished by implosion on December 29, 2002.

History
Riverfront was a multi-purpose, circular "cookie-cutter" stadium, one of many built in the United States in the late 1960s and early 1970s as communities sought to save money by having their football and baseball teams share the same facility. Riverfront, Veterans Stadium in Philadelphia, Busch Memorial Stadium in St. Louis, Atlanta–Fulton County Stadium in Atlanta, Three Rivers Stadium in Pittsburgh, Shea Stadium in New York and Robert F. Kennedy Memorial Stadium in Washington, D.C. all opened within a few years of each other and were largely indistinguishable from one another; in particular, it was often confused with fellow Ohio River cookie-cutter Three Rivers Stadium by sportscasters because of the two stadium's similar names and similar designs.

One feature of Riverfront that distinguished it from other cookie-cutters was that the field level seats for baseball were divided in half directly behind home plate, with the third-base side stands wheeled to left field and the ones on the first-base side remaining stationary for conversion to a football seating configuration. The AstroTurf panels covering the tracks could be seen in left field during Reds games.

The site Riverfront Stadium sat on originally included the 2nd Street tenement, birthplace and boyhood home of cowboy singer and actor Roy Rogers, who joked that he was born "somewhere between second base and center field."

Riverfront Stadium's scoreboard was designed by American Sign and Indicator, but in its last years was maintained by Trans-Lux.  That scoreboard would be upgraded in the 1980s with the addition of an adjacent Sony JumboTron. The playing field was originally illuminated by 1,648 thousand-watt GTE Sylvania Metalarc lamps.

Big Red Machine
The Reds moved to Riverfront Stadium midway through the 1970 season, after spending over 86 years at the intersection of Findlay Street and Western Avenue – the last 57½ of those years at Crosley Field.  Riverfront quickly earned a place in Cincinnati's century-long baseball tradition as the home of one of the best teams in baseball history. The Reds had only won three pennants in their final 39 years at Crosley Field (1939, 1940, 1961) but made the World Series in Riverfront's first year (1970) and a total of four times in the stadium's first seven years, with the Reds winning back-to-back championships in 1975 and 1976. The World Series would return in 1990, with Cincinnati winning the first two of a four-game sweep of the Oakland Athletics at Riverfront.

Baseball purists disliked Riverfront's artificial turf, but Reds' Manager Sparky Anderson and General Manager Bob Howsam took advantage of it by encouraging speed and line drive hitting that could produce doubles, triples and high-bouncing infield hits. Players who combined power and speed like Joe Morgan, Pete Rose and Ken Griffey, Sr. thrived there. On defense, the fast surface and virtually dirtless infield (see photo) rewarded range and quickness by both outfielders and infielders, like shortstop Dave Concepción who used the turf to bounce many of his long throws to first. Catcher Johnny Bench and first baseman Tony Pérez played here. The artificial turf covered not only the normal grass area of the ballpark but also most of the normally dirt-covered portion of the infield; the infield area boundary where dirt would normally be was denoted with a white lined arc. Only the pitcher's mound, the home plate area (in two circled areas), and cutouts around first, second and third bases had dirt surfaces (which were covered in five-sided diamond shaped areas). This was the first stadium in the majors with this "sliding pit" configuration. Most of the new stadiums with artificial turf that would follow (Veterans Stadium, Royals Stadium, Louisiana Superdome, Olympic Stadium (Montreal), Exhibition Stadium, Kingdome, Hubert H. Humphrey Metrodome, B.C. Place, SkyDome) installed sliding pits as the original layout, and the existing artificial turf fields in San Francisco, Houston, Pittsburgh, and St. Louis would change to the cut-out configuration within the next few years after Riverfront's opening.

Riverfront hosted the MLB All-Star Game twice: first on July 14, 1970 with President Richard Nixon in attendance (51,838 total attendance), and again on July 12, 1988 (55,837 attendance).

Professional football
Despite Cincinnati's love of baseball, it was the prospect of a professional football team that finally moved the city to end 20 years of discussion and build a new stadium on the downtown riverfront. After playing for two seasons at Nippert Stadium on the University of Cincinnati  campus, the Bengals built on the Reds' success in the stadium's first year when they recorded their first winning season and playoff appearance in 1970, just their third year of existence.

Perhaps the most memorable football game at Riverfront was the AFC Championship on January 10, 1982. The game became known as the Freezer Bowl and was won by the Bengals over the San Diego Chargers, 27–7. The win earned the Bengals their first of two trips to the Super Bowl (XVI) while playing at Riverfront, and the first of three in team history overall.

Riverfront Stadium hosted the 1988 AFC Championship, as the Bengals beat the Buffalo Bills 21–10 to advance to their second Super Bowl appearance.

During the Bengals' tenure, they defeated every visiting franchise at least once, enjoying perfect records against the Arizona Cardinals (4-0), New York Giants (4-0), and Philadelphia Eagles (3-0). They posted a 5–1 record in playoff games played in Riverfront Stadium, with victories over the Buffalo Bills (twice), San Diego Chargers, Seattle Seahawks, and Houston Oilers. Their only home playoff loss came to the New York Jets.

For most of the Bengals' tenure at the stadium, the field contained only the basic markings required for play. Until the late 1990s, there wasn't a logo at midfield or any writing in the end zone, which had long become standard in NFL stadiums.

During the 1988 season as the Bengals were making another Super Bowl run, Riverfront Stadium was nicknamed the Jungle as the Bengals went a perfect 10-0 at home during the regular season and in the playoffs. With the new stadium nickname, the fans and team adopted the Guns N' Roses song "Welcome to the Jungle" as the unofficial theme song for the Bengals.  When Paul Brown Stadium (now Paycor Stadium) opened in 2000, the Jungle theme was incorporated into the stadium design.

College football
Between 1970 and 1990 Riverfront Stadium hosted 25 University of Cincinnati football games to accommodate higher-caliber visiting teams and local rivals which would overwhelm demand in their usual on-campus home, Nippert Stadium (which then could only hold 28,000). Among the Bearcats' opponents were the University of Maryland, University of Kentucky, University of Louisville, Boston College, West Virginia University, Penn State University, whose 1985 game took place with the Nittany Lions number one in the coaches' poll, and the University of Miami three times, twice while the Hurricanes were the defending national champions. It would be a temporary full-time home for the Bearcats during the 1990 season, when Nippert Stadium was undergoing renovations.

The Bearcats finished with a 12–13 all-time record at Riverfront.

Final years as a baseball-only stadium

When the Bengals moved to Paul Brown Stadium in 2000, the Reds were left as Cinergy Field's only tenant. Prior to the 2001 baseball season, the stadium was remodeled into a baseball-only configuration, and the artificial surface was replaced with natural grass.

A  wall was built in deep center field to prevent easy home runs. The new Great American Ball Park and old Riverfront Stadium were 26 inches apart at their closest point during this time. In the Reds' final two seasons in the stadium, ongoing construction on Great American was plainly visible just beyond the outfield walls while the team played their games. The stadium's final game was played on September 22, 2002, as the Reds lost 4–3 to the Philadelphia Phillies before a crowd of 40,964. Reds third baseman Aaron Boone hit the final home run in Riverfront's history in the loss, an eighth-inning solo home run off Phillies reliever Dan Plesac.

The stadium was demolished by implosion on December 29, 2002. Part of the former Riverfront Stadium site is now occupied by Great American Ball Park (which would open the following April) and the National Underground Railroad Freedom Center, along with several mixed-use developments and parking facilities. A small portion of the site is now occupied by the Reds' Hall of Fame and Museum and Main Street, which was extended when the new park was built and when the old park was demolished.

Seating capacity

Attendance records
Bold indicates the winner of each game.

Baseball

Football

Milestones

Baseball

First stadium to have its entire field covered by AstroTurf, except for the cutouts around the bases and pitcher's mound.
First hit: Félix Millán, June 30, 1970.
First home run: Hank Aaron, June 30, 1970.
First Presidential Visit: Richard Nixon, July 14, 1970.
First upper deck home run: Tony Pérez, August 11, 1970.
First World Series game ever played on artificial turf: October 10, 1970 (Reds vs. Baltimore Orioles).
First no-hitter: Ken Holtzman, June 3, 1971.
First pitcher ever to pitch a no-hitter and hit two home runs in the same game: Rick Wise, June 23, 1971.
 Hank Aaron ties the all-time home run record with number 714: April 4, 1974.
 First stadium to display metric distances on the outfield walls (100.58 meters down the lines, 114.30 to the alleys, 123.13 to center): 1976.
 Highest season attendance, 2,629,708: 1976.
 First rain checks issued: August 30, 1978.
 First player to hit for the cycle: Mike Easler, June 12, 1980.
 Pete Rose breaks the all-time hit record with number 4,192: September 11, 1985.
 First player ever to be caught stealing four times in one game: Robby Thompson, June 27, 1986.
Perfect Game: Tom Browning, September 16, 1988.
Umpire John McSherry collapsed and died on April 1, 1996.
Ray Lankford hits two upper-deck home runs on July 15, 1997, becoming the only player to do so in the stadium's history to that point.
Longest home run, 473': Mark McGwire, May 5, 2000.

Football
First touchdown: Sam Wyche, September 20, 1970
First Field goal: Horst Muhlmann, September 20, 1970
Freezer Bowl: lowest wind-chill (2nd lowest temperature) in NFL history, January 10, 1982
Steve Largent becomes the first player in NFL History to catch 100 TD's in career, December 10, 1989.
Corey Dillon breaks the single-game rookie rushing record with 246 yards on December 4, 1997.

Concerts

The Kool Jazz Festival (now the Macy's Music Festival) was an annual fixture.

Religious gatherings
The Jehovah's Witnesses hosted three conventions in the stadium, in 1971, 1974 and 1978.
Promise Keepers held a meeting there in 1997.

Gallery

References

Sources
Dittmar, Joseph J. (1997). Baseball Records Registry: The Best and Worst Single-Day Performances and the Stories Behind Them. McFarland & Company. 
Munsey & Suppes (1996–2004). Riverfront Stadium. Ballparks.
Smith, Ron (2000). Riverfront Stadium. The Ballpark Book. The Sporting News. 
Riverfront Stadium Opens. BaseballLibrary.com.

External links

 A Farewell to Cinergy Field. MLB.com.
 Cinergy Field: Kiss it Goodbye. Cincinnati.com.
 Riverfront Stadium/Cinergy Field. Ballparks of Baseball.
 Riverfront Stadium/Cinergy Field. Stadiums of Pro Football
 Cinergy Field. BaseballLibrary.com.

2002 disestablishments in Ohio
American football venues in Ohio
Baseball venues in Ohio
Buildings and structures demolished by controlled implosion
Cincinnati Bengals stadiums
Cincinnati Reds stadiums
Defunct Major League Baseball venues
Defunct National Football League venues
Defunct American football venues in the United States
Defunct baseball venues in the United States  
Defunct multi-purpose stadiums in the United States
Demolished sports venues in Ohio
Multi-purpose stadiums in the United States
Sports venues completed in 1970
Sports venues demolished in 2002
Sports venues in Cincinnati
1970 establishments in Ohio